Leanne Kiernan (born 27 April 1999) is an Irish footballer who plays as a striker for Liverpool of the WSL and the Republic of Ireland.

Early life
Born in Bailieborough in County Cavan, Kiernan attended Bailieborough Community School, where she played for the girls footsal team. She played with Bailieboro Celtic and, at the age of 12, with the boys team at Kingscourt Harps, where she was spotted by FAI scout Mark Leavy and selected for their emerging talent programme. Outside of soccer, Kiernan had been an accomplished cross-country runner, winning the Ulster club juvenile cross-country championship four times with Shercock Athletic Club, and finishing fourth in the Irish U-13 cross-country championships in 2011. She also played Gaelic football for Cavan up to U-16 level. She lived with her family on a pig farm in Killinkere.

Club career

Shelbourne (2015–2018)

Kiernan joined Shelbourne at the age of 15. On 1 May 2016, she scored the winner for Shelbourne against UCD Waves in the WNL Cup final at Richmond Park. In the 2015–16 season, she scored 5 goals. In 2016, she scored 12 goals and was part of the "invincible" Shelbourne side that won the WNL without losing a single game. On 6 November 2016, she scored a hat-trick against Wexford Youths in the FAI Women's Cup final. In January 2017, she was named Young Player of the Year at 2016 Continental Tyres Women's National League Awards, earning a spot in the Team of the Year as well. The following week, she was also named Sportswoman of the Month for December 2016 by The Irish Times. On 22 August 2017, she made her UEFA Women's Champions League debut in a 0–0 draw with KKPK Medyk Konin. She finished the 2017 season with 9 goals. Kiernan began the 2018 season with 11 goals in her first six games – taking her total to 37 league goals in her three-and-a-half years with Shelbourne – before her departure in July.

West Ham United (2018–2021)

On 18 July 2018, Kiernan signed with West Ham United. On 19 August 2018, she made her debut in a 3–1 loss to Arsenal in the FA WSL Cup. On 26 August 2018, she scored her first goal in a 4–1 win over Lewes.

On 21 May 2021 Kiernan left West Ham following the expiry of her contract.

Liverpool F.C. (2021–)

On 22 June 2021, Kiernan signed for Liverpool F.C. Women, where she was re-united with her former West Ham manager Matt Beard and was assigned the number 9 jersey. She recovered from shin splints which had disrupted her progress and recaptured her goal scoring form in the 2021–22 FA Women's Championship season. She scored 13 goals for the title-winning Liverpool team who won promotion back to the Women's Super League, and signed a new contract with Liverpool in September 2022. On the opening day of the 2022–23 Women's Super League season, Kiernan suffered an ankle injury in Liverpool's 2–1 win over Chelsea which required surgery and ruled her out for several months.

International career
Kiernan received a senior call-up in August 2016, first coming into the squad for two challenge matches against Wales in Newport. She scored the winner on her competitive debut, a 2–1 victory against the Basque Country at Tallaght Stadium on 26 November 2016.

International goals

Scores and results list Republic of Ireland's goal tally first.

Career statistics

International
.

Honours

Club

Shelbourne
 WNL: 2016
 WNL Cup: 2015–16
 FAI Women's Cup: 2016

Liverpool FC
 FA Women's Championship: 2021-22

Individual
 WNL Young Player of the Year: 2016
 WNL Team of the Year: 2016
 The Irish Times Sportswoman of the Month: December 2016

References

External links

Leanne Kiernan at West Ham United
Leanne Kiernan at Football Association of Ireland
Leanne Kiernan at Extratime

1999 births
Living people
Republic of Ireland women's association footballers
Republic of Ireland women's international footballers
Women's National League (Ireland) players
Shelbourne F.C. (women) players
West Ham United F.C. Women players
Irish expatriate sportspeople in England
Expatriate women's footballers in England
Republic of Ireland expatriate association footballers
Women's association football forwards
Women's Super League players
Sportspeople from County Cavan
Cavan ladies' Gaelic footballers
Ladies' Gaelic footballers who switched code
Liverpool F.C. Women players
Women's Championship (England) players
Republic of Ireland women's youth international footballers